Bounds Lott is a historic home located west of Allen in Wicomico County, Maryland, United States. It consists of the original four-bay, -story dwelling with three small additions; two having been moved from Sussex County, Delaware. The additions were remodeled in their new location in 1975.

Bounds Lott was listed on the National Register of Historic Places in 1978.

References

External links
, including photo from 1968, at Maryland Historical Trust

Allen, Maryland
Houses in Wicomico County, Maryland
Houses on the National Register of Historic Places in Maryland
Historic American Buildings Survey in Maryland
National Register of Historic Places in Wicomico County, Maryland